The Nive Nulls was a YouTube channel of daily Vlogs, with over 350,000 subscribers. The vlogs feature the Null Family who live in Kansas City, Missouri. The family of five consist of husband, Austin, his wife, Brittany, and their three young children Audriauna, Kailand, and Maddox. The Nulls are an interracial family; Austin Null is white and Brittany Null is African American. Austin Null was inspired by the vlogging family YouTube channel, the SHAYTARDS to create his family's own YouTube channel. The Nive Nulls and the Shaytards were later to become friends can be seen making appearances in each other's Vlogs. The family posts videos Monday through Friday, of their daily lives as parents, which include typical family behaviors such as taking care of their children and eating together. They also share their experiences of racism, interracial relationships, natural hair and, Christianity. They began their channel in 2010 and have over 60,000,000 views. Their channel has propelled other YouTube family vloggers such as Austin’s own brother, Grayson Null and his wife, former gymnast Elyse Hopfner-Hibbs (Null). The Nive Nulls have over 80,102,662 views on their YouTube channel. In 2013 they won a YouTube Next Up Award. Brittany Null has her own YouTube channel titled "Britt's Breakdown" where she Vlogs about fashion, cooking and, motherhood.

In July 2017, the couple announced their divorce in a vlog. Austin added that he would not be in future family vlogs, leaving Brittany to solely manage the channel and continue to vlog daily with their children. Ultimately, the channel was renamed "Britt's Space."

References

YouTube channels launched in 2010
Families from Kansas
Interracial relationships